Allan da Silva Wolski (born 18 January 1990) is a Brazilian athlete specialising in the hammer throw.

His personal best in the event is 73.54 metres set in São Bernardo do Campo in 2015.

Competition record

References

Living people
1990 births
Athletes from São Paulo
Brazilian male hammer throwers
Pan American Games athletes for Brazil
Athletes (track and field) at the 2015 Pan American Games
Athletes (track and field) at the 2019 Pan American Games
Brazilian people of Polish descent
South American Games gold medalists for Brazil
South American Games medalists in athletics
Competitors at the 2014 South American Games
Athletes (track and field) at the 2018 South American Games
Troféu Brasil de Atletismo winners
20th-century Brazilian people
21st-century Brazilian people